Mór is an Irish female given name.

Description

Mór is a feminine first name used in Ireland since the medieval era. It may have been the original form of the name Maureen. 
 
It is distinct from the descriptive term "mór", which designates "big" or "senior".

Bearers of the name

 Mór ingen Cearbhaill, Queen of Laigin, died 916.
 Mór ingen Donnchadha, Queen of Ireland, died 986.
 Mór ingen Taidhg an Tuir, Queen of Ireland, died 992.
 Mór Ní Briain, Queen of Connacht,  died 1137.
 Mór Ní Tuathail, Queen of Leinster, c. 1114–1191.

External links
 http://www.medievalscotland.org/kmo/AnnalsIndex/Feminine/Mor.shtml

Irish-language feminine given names